Colors are the insignia, or "patches", worn by motorcycle club members on cut-off vests to identify membership of their club and territorial location. Club patches have been worn by many different groups since the 1960s.  They are regarded by many to symbolize an elite amongst motorcyclists and the style has been widely copied by other subcultures and commercialized.

Colors are considered to represent "significant markers of the socialization" of new members to clubs, rank and present a dominant symbol of identity and are marked with related symbolism. They can be embroidered patches sewn onto clothing or stenciled in paint, the primary symbol being the back patch of the club's insignia or logo and generally remain the property of the club. Wearing such clothing is referred to as "flying one's colors". The term has its roots in military history, originating with regimental colours.

Meaning

Colors identify the rank of members within clubs from new members, to "prospects" to full members known as "patch-holders", and usually consist of a top and bottom circumferential badge called a rocker, due to the curved shape, with the  stating the club name, the  stating the location or territory, and a central logo of the club's insignia, with a fourth, smaller badge carrying the initials "MC" standing for "motorcycle club".

The badges are used to create a social bond and boundaries and, generally, belong to the clubs involved rather than the individual wearing them. The wearing of them can often lead individuals to be refused service at related businesses and bars, and some biker bars have a "no colors" policy, to reduce conflict. Claiming territory by wearing a bottom rocker can lead to violent conflict with a rival club, such as in the 2015 Waco shootout, which was partially caused by a club wearing a "Texas" bottom rocker.

Many motorcyclists wearing colors are from "family oriented" motorcycling clubs chartered by the American Motorcyclist Association and wear one-piece patches to differentiate themselves from three piece patches of outlaw bikers. These generally do not state a territorial location. The motorcycle manufacturer Harley-Davidson notably adopted the style in its branding and community-building effort, the Harley Owners Group.

Law and order colors and/or insignia 

As with outlaw motorcycle clubs visual identification of a member of a club is indicated by a specific large club patch or set of patches usually located in the middle of the back of a vest or jacket. The patches may contain a club logo, the name of the club and other chapter identification.

In most motorcycle clubs the patch representing membership in the organization is often referred to as "the club colors" or simply "the colors".  Each club has rules on how the colors are treated and when it is proper to wear them.  Well structured clubs have bylaws dictating the behavior of its members and thus the proper use of their colors.

Tattoos
Tattoos may also come under the category of club colors.

See also
Gang colors
School colors
Sports uniform

References

External links

Motorcycling subculture